Barry Levinson is a writer, director and producer.

He is known for his work in film and television. He has received various awards and nominations including six Academy Award nominations winning for Best Director for Rain Man (1988). He also received nominations for ...And Justice for All (1979), Diner (1982), Avalon (1990), and Bugsy (1991). He received three Golden Globe Award for Best Director nominations for Rain Man, Avalon, and Bugsy. He has received eleven Primetime Emmy Award nominations winning four times for his work on The Carol Burnett Show and Homicide: Life on the Street. He also received nominations for his work on various HBO television films including You Don't Know Jack (2010), Phil Spector (2013), The Wizard of Lies (2017), and Paterno (2018).

Major awards

Academy Awards

Critics' Choice Movie Awards

Golden Globe Awards

Primetime Emmy Awards

Guild awards

Directors Guild of America Awards

Producers Guild of America Awards

Writers Guild of America Awards

Critics awards

Boston Society of Film Critics Awards

Chicago Film Critics Association Awards

International Documentary Association Awards

Kansas City Film Critics Circle Awards

Los Angeles Film Critics Association Awards

National Board of Review Awards

National Society of Film Critics Awards

New York Film Critics Circle Awards

Online Film & Television Association Awards

Film festival awards

Berlin International Film Festival

Toronto International Film Festival

Miscellaneous awards

César Awards

Golden Raspberry Awards

Satellite Awards

Stinkers Bad Movie Awards

References

Levinson, Barry